Hosianna Mantra is the third album by German band Popol Vuh. It was originally released in 1972 on the German record label Pilz. The album saw the band blend elements of Western classical music, Asian music, and space rock. For the release, bandleader Florian Fricke abandoned electronic synthesizers and instead employed acoustic instruments such as piano, oboe, and tambura. Prominently featured are Korean vocalist Djong Yun and electric guitarist Conny Veit.

Release 

In 2004 SPV re-released the album with one bonus track, "Maria (Ave Maria)", originally released on a 1972 solo single by Korean vocalist Djong Yun.

Critical reception 
Hosianna Mantra has garnered acclaim from English-language publications in recent years. Writing for The Sydney Morning Herald, Chris Johnston praised it as "bold, beautiful, and lying at the outer reaches even of krautrock, the German indie music of the 1970s." Wilson Neate of AllMusic remarked that the album has a "timeless, healing quality" that is "far removed from the everyday world and yet at one with it." Raul Stanciu of Sputnikmusic called the work "an overlooked masterpiece", and Gary Bearman of Perfect Sound Forever likewise described it as "majestic – a revelation, an epiphany, a high point in the history of music."

Track listing 

All tracks composed by Florian Fricke.  Lyrics based on original texts by Martin Buber.

 "Ah!" – 4:40
 "Kyrie" – 5:23
 "Hosianna Mantra" – 10:09
 "Abschied" – 3:14
 "Segnung" – 6:07
 "Andacht" – 0:47
 "Nicht hoch im Himmel" – 6:18
 "Andacht" – 0:46

2004 bonus track
"Maria (Ave Maria)" – 4:30

Personnel 

Florian Fricke – piano, cembalo, production
Conny Veit – electric guitar, 12-string guitar, production
Robert Eliscu – oboe, production
Djong Yun – vocals, production
Klaus Wiese – tamboura, production

 Additional personnel

Fritz Sonnleitner – violin

 Technical personnel

 Peter Kramper – mixing
 Wolfgang Loeper – engineering
 Hans Endrulat – engineering
 Toni Heudorf – engineering assistance
 Ingo Trauer – album cover design
 Richard J. Rudow – album cover design
 Bettina Fricke – sleeve photography

References

External links 

 Popol Vuh discography
 Hosianna Mantra at Venco.com.pl

Popol Vuh (band) albums
1972 albums
Pilz (record label) albums